UMR may stand for:

 Underground Media Revolution, a music e-zine in Pakistan
 Uninitialized Memory Reads
 University of Missouri–Rolla, former name of the Missouri University of Science and Technology
 University of Minnesota Rochester
 Unreal Media Ripper -  tool for extracting media(sounds and music) from games made in the unreal system
 Upper Mississippi River
 Ursula Maier-Rabler
 United Muslim Relief
 unité mixte de recherche, a French administrative entity created between a research center located in a public university and a French Scientific and Technical Research Establishment(Établissement public à caractère scientifique et technologique) like CNRS or INRA
 United Medical Resources, subsidiary and third party administrator for United Healthcare Services Incorporated, a medical insurance provider.
 Unique Market Reference, a type of unique ID used in the insurance industry
and also :
 RAAF Base Woomera, IATA airport code "UMR"